Ronald A. Gostick (July 18, 1918 – July 16, 2005) was a long-time figure on the Canadian far right and founder of the Canadian League of Rights. Gostick was involved in the Canadian social credit movement and later published far-right and antisemitic material over the course of 50 years, including the Canadian Intelligence Service and On Target! and numerous books and pamphlets.

Gostick influenced several figures on the Canadian far right. Jim Keegstra got most of his reading material through his membership in Gostick's League. He also collaborated with John Ross Taylor and was a mentor to Paul Fromm and an associate of Patrick Walsh, a fellow traveller who worked as research director at the CLR. He was also associated with former Member of Parliament John A. Gamble, who worked with Gostick as Canadian leader of the World Anti-Communist League in the 1980s.

David Lethbridge, an anti-fascist activist and Communist Party member, described the CLR and Gostick as a "danger" because they soft-pedaled an essentially "fascist" message. Lethbridge told The Globe and Mail that "What made them dangerous was that they came across as mainstream."

Biography
Ron Gostick was born in Merthyr Tydfil, Wales to Canadian parents and moved with them to Canada shortly after the First World War. They established a homestead near Stettler, Alberta and lived there for nine years before moving to Calgary. From 1933 to 1935, he attended Crescent Heights High School and was influenced by the school's principal, William Aberhart, a proponent of the social credit movement in Alberta. Gostick and his family joined the Alberta Social Credit League. His mother, Edith Gostick, was elected to the Legislative Assembly of Alberta in the 1935 provincial election. This election brought her party, the Social Credit, to power and made Aberhart Premier of Alberta. She served as one of the five Member of the Legislative Assembly for Calgary until 1940. Then she took a position as Legislative Librarian.

Ron Gostick entered the Canadian Army in 1941 and fought in the Second World War. After demobilization, he worked as a court reporter in Ontario and served as national secretary of the Social Credit Party of Canada, the less successful federal counterpart of Aberhardt's Alberta Social Credit party. He settled in Flesherton, Ontario where he spent most of the rest of his life. In the 1945 federal election, he ran as the Social Credit candidate in the Ontario riding of Grey North, coming in last place out of four candidates, with 250 votes.

In 1946, Gostick founded the "Union of Electors", a social credit based provincial party that was inspired by the more radical Quebec wing of the Canadian social credit movement, the Union des electeurs.

He also began his publishing activities at the same time, beginning to issue the periodical Social Credit in 1947. The Social Credit Association of Canada disowned the publication in 1950 because of its anti-Semitism. Gostick renamed the periodical The Canadian Intelligence Service in 1951.

He wrote (or co-wrote) several books:

Canada's Future - More Debt and Bankruptcy? Or Financial Reform and Prosperity? (2002)

(co-written with Eric D. Butler)  The Battle for Canada

The Architects Behind the World Communist Conspiracy (1968)

Canada the Moment of Truth (1978)

Canada - its Glorious Potential and The Things I Didn't Learn in School

A Prophecy? (1980)

Zionism and the Middle Eastern Crisis ("Published as the Supplementary Section of THE CANADIAN INTELLIGENCE SERVICE", August 1958)

In the early 1950s, Gostick was a public speaker at meetings sponsored by the American rightists Gerald Smith and Wesley Swift (who later founded the Christian Identity movement). Gostick founded the Canadian Anti-Communist League with a mandate of exposing the "Communist-Zionist-monopolist-finance enemy of Christian civilization." The CACL became the Canadian affiliate of the World Anti-Communist League once the larger body was formed in the 1960s. The CACL became the Christian Action Movement and later in 1967 became the "Canadian League of Rights" (CLR). B'nai B'rith described the organization as being "long-known to support racist and anti-Semitic positions".

Gostick died of cancer two days before his 87th birthday.

Footnotes

External links
On Target Vol.41 No.33 contains an obituary of Ron Gostick.

1918 births
2005 deaths
Social Credit Party of Canada candidates in the 1945 Canadian federal election
Canadian anti-communists
Canadian social crediters
Welsh emigrants to Canada
Canadian military personnel of World War II
Deaths from cancer in Canada
People from Merthyr Tydfil
British emigrants to Canada